Sir Robert Napier, 2nd Baronet (c. 1603 – 7 March 1661), of Luton Hoo in Bedfordshire, was an English member of parliament.

He was the eldest son of Sir Robert Napier, 1st Baronet, and succeeded to the baronetcy on 22 April 1637, having already been knighted in his own right on 23 April 1623. He was educated at Exeter College, Oxford and was a member of Gray's Inn. He sat in Parliament as member for Corfe Castle in the Parliament of 1625-6 and for Weymouth in that of 1628–9, then represented Peterborough in the Long Parliament until being excluded in Pride's Purge.

Sir Robert married, first, Frances Thornhurst by whom he had one son, Robert. He died within his father's lifetime and his son, also called Robert, succeeded his grandfather in the baronetcy. Sir Robert's second marriage was to Lady Penelope Egerton, daughter of John Egerton, 1st Earl of Bridgewater, and by her had two other sons and one daughter. He settled his estate on these two sons, of whom the eldest, John, eventually inherited the baronetcy after the failure of the senior line.

References
 
 Dictionary of National Biography
 Burke's Extinct and Dormant Baronetcies (2nd edition, London: John Russell Smith, 1844) 

1600s births
1661 deaths
Baronets in the Baronetage of England
Robert, 2nd Baronet
English MPs 1625
English MPs 1626
English MPs 1628–1629
English MPs 1640–1648